Radošovce is a village and municipality in Skalica District in the Trnava Region of western Slovakia.

History 
In historical records the village was first mentioned in 1473.

Geography 
The municipality lies at an altitude of 223 metres and covers an area of 26.599 km². It has a population of about 1812 people.

References

External links

  Official page
 http://www.statistics.sk/mosmis/eng/run.html

Villages and municipalities in Skalica District